Samuel Warren may refer to:

 Sir Samuel Warren (1769–1839), English naval officer
 Samuel Warren (minister) (1781–1862), English Wesleyan Methodist who formed a breakaway group of "Warrenites", in later life an Anglican priest
 Samuel Warren (British lawyer) (1807–1877), barrister and author, MP for Midhurst from 1856 to 1859, son of the minister
 Samuel D. Warren (1818–1888), American paper magnate and father of Samuel D. Warren II
 Samuel D. Warren II (1852–1910), American attorney, co-author (with Brandeis) of the classic law review article The Right to Privacy (1890)

See also
 Dr. Samuel Warren House, a historic house in Newton, Massachusetts